Bluff Lake Nature Center is a  wildlife refuge and environmental education center in Denver, Colorado, located along Sand Creek on the eastern edge of the former Stapleton International Airport.  Bluff Lake hosts nearly 40,000 visitors each year, with the majority coming from east Denver neighborhoods and part of school-based and public programs.

Programs
Bluff Lake Nature Center offers science education programs in partnership with Denver Public Schools, Aurora Public Schools, and Adams County Public Schools.  A summer fireside chat series is held with The Nature Conservancy of Colorado and week-long Junior Naturalist camps are held in June, July, and August.

Bluff Lake Nature Center is free and open to the public, serving a role as unplanned open space for children and families in the nearby neighborhoods.

Habitat and wildlife
Bluff Lake Nature Center consists of a variety of native habitats including wetlands, short-grass prairie, a riparian zone and wetland woodland. Thanks to its 60 year history as an airport buffer, Bluff Lake has become an urban wildlife refuge for waterfowl, shorebirds, raptors, songbirds, deer, fox, beaver, reptiles, amphibians and other types of wildlife that visit or live at the site.

External links
Bluff Lake Nature Center
Sand Creek Regional Greenway

Nature centers in Colorado
Tourist attractions in Denver
Protected areas of Denver
Education in Denver
Bodies of water of Denver
Lakes of Colorado